Erebonasteridae is a family of crustaceans belonging to the order Cyclopoida.

Genera:
 Ambilimbus Ivanenko, Defaye & Huys, 2005
 Centobnaster Huys & Boxshall, 1990
 Erebonaster Humes, 1987
 Nansennaster Martínez Arbizu, 1999
 Tychidion Humes, 1973

References

Cyclopoida